Scutiger  may refer to:
 Scutiger (fungus), a genus of fungi in the family Albatrellaceae
 Scutiger (frog), a genus of toads in the family Megophryidae